The siege of Vellore was an intermittent series of sieges and blockades conducted during the Second Anglo-Mysore War by forces of the Kingdom of Mysore against a British East India Company garrison holding the fortress at Vellore, located in the present-day Indian state of Tamil Nadu.

First besieged in 1780, Mysore's ruler Hyder Ali eventually reduced the siege to a blockade due to the need for troops elsewhere.  The blockade was ineffectively maintained until 1782 before being abandoned. The British successfully resupplied the garrison of Colonel Ross Lang four times.

References
Vibart, H. M (1881). The military history of the Madras engineers and pioneers, from 1743 up to the present time, Volume 1

Conflicts in 1780
Conflicts in 1781
Conflicts in 1782
Sieges involving the British East India Company
Sieges involving the Kingdom of Mysore
Siege of Vellore
Siege of Vellore
Siege of Vellore
Battles of the Second Anglo-Mysore War
History of Tamil Nadu